Events from the year 1280 in Ireland.

Incumbent
Lord: Edward I

Events

 Alice Kyteler, alleged witch and the first recorded person condemned for witchcraft in Ireland (d. c 1325) marries first husband William Outlaw between 1280 and 1285.

Births

Deaths

References

 
1280s in Ireland
Ireland
Years of the 13th century in Ireland